Lolaniso Ibrohimovna Ismoilova  (born October 4, 1929) is a Tajikistani biologist, active during the Soviet era.

Born into a working-class family in Dushanbe, Ismoilova graduated from the Department of Biology of the Tajikistan State University in 1953. In 1965 she joined the Communist Party of the Soviet Union. She became an assistant professor in the Department of Histology at the University in 1970, and in 1974 was promoted to become head of the Department of Biology and General Genetics of the Tajikistan State Medical Institute. She received a doctoral degree in biology in 1986. As a researcher, Ismoilova concerned herself with the structure and function of lymph nodes once they had been subjected to fire. She also studied post-traumatic postnatal issues, and did work on the restoration and transplantation of blood vessels in kidneys. Among her publications are Environmental Upkeep and People's Health (1984) and A Short Russian-Tajiki-Dari Dictionary of Biology (Dushanbe, 1973). She has published over 180 articles and papers during her career, including 24 instructional methods and two textbooks.

References

1929 births
Living people
Tajikistani biologists
Women biologists
Tajikistani women scientists
20th-century women scientists
20th-century biologists
21st-century women scientists
21st-century biologists
Communist Party of the Soviet Union members
People from Dushanbe
Tajik National University alumni
Academic staff of Tajik National University
Soviet biologists
Soviet women scientists